Mohsin Khan (born October 26, 1991) is an Indian television actor known for portraying the role of Kartik Goenka in Star Plus' Yeh Rishta Kya Kehlata Hai.

Early life

Mohsin Khan is a Gujarati Muslims, who was born in Nadiad, Gujarat. Initially, he was named Waseem, but soon, his father changed his name to Mohsin Khan. He has a strong connection to Gujarat because of fond memories of his childhood years in Nadiad and tries to visit his family there, regularly. His family includes his father Abdul Waheed Khan, mother Mehzabin Khan, sister Zeba Ahmed, brother-in-law Dr. Taha Ahmed and younger brother Sajjad Khan.

Career

Khan started his career as the second assistant director on the film Koyelaanchal. He made his television debut with Star Plus's Nisha Aur Uske Cousins, but rose to fame playing Kartik Goenka in Yeh Rishta Kya Kehlata Hai, opposite Shivangi Joshi.

Media

In Eastern Eye's list of 50 Sexiest Asian Men in the world, Khan was ranked at No. 17 in 2017, and at No. 6 in 2018.

He was ranked in The Times Most Desirable Men at No. 46 in 2018, at No. 43 in 2019 as well as 2020.

In 2020, he was ranked at No. 5 in The Times 20 Most Desirable Men on Television 2020.

Filmography

Television

Special appearances

Music videos

Awards and nominations

See also 
 List of Indian television actors

References

External links

 
 

1991 births
Living people
Indian male television actors
Male actors from Mumbai
Gujarati people
Male actors from Gujarat
People from Nadiad